Somethin' Else is a jazz album by alto saxophonist Julian "Cannonball" Adderley, his only album on the Blue Note label, recorded and released in 1958. Also on the session is trumpeter Miles Davis in one of his handful of recording dates for Blue Note. Adderley was a member of Davis' group at the time, and the album was recorded shortly after Davis' own landmark album Milestones. The Penguin Guide to Jazz selected Somethin' Else as part of its suggested "Core Collection."

Background
The album was recorded during Adderley's membership in the Miles Davis' First Great Quintet, and it also marks one of the few recordings Davis made as a sideman after 1955. Indeed, Davis plays several of the first solos, composed the bluesy title track and, according to the liner notes, chose most of the material. "Autumn Leaves" would remain in the Davis book, and "Love for Sale" would be recorded by the Davis Sextet a little over two months later. In the original liner notes for album, Miles is quoted as follows: "All my inspiration today comes from Ahmad Jamal, the Chicago pianist. I got the idea for this treatment of "Autumn Leaves" from him."

The twelve-bar blues "One for Daddy-O" was written by Adderley's brother Nat for Chicago radio DJ Holmes "Daddy-O" Daylie. At the end of that track, Davis can be heard addressing producer Alfred Lion, saying "is that what you wanted, Alfred?" Adderley and Davis would also play together on the 1958 Columbia Records release Milestones, as well as the 1959 landmark Kind of Blue, one of the most universally acclaimed jazz albums.

Reissue bonus tracks
In the 1980s, the album was re-issued with a bonus track from the recording session that was listed as "Alison's Uncle" and credited to Cannonball Adderley. The track appeared as "Alison's Uncle" on compact disc releases in the U.S. and Japan in 1986, and it continued to appear under this title, or as "Bangoon (aka Alison's Uncle)", on reissues into the 21st century. The composition is actually Hank Jones' "Bangoon", and first appeared on Gigi Gryce's 1957 Jubilee Records album Jazz Lab, with Jones playing piano. (Gryce also recorded a second version of the tune with Jones on his Gigi Gryce album.) The title "Alison's Uncle" was created by Nat Adderley in the 1980s when he was asked by reissue producers to name a track that they could not identify. Nat Adderley's alternate title refers to the session having taken shortly after his daughter Alison had been born.

An alternate take of "Autumn Leaves" was released as a bonus track on a 2013 CD release in Japan.

Track listing

Side one

Side two

1986 Blue Note CD bonus track (U.S. and Japan releases)

2013 Blue Note SHM-CD edition (Japan)

Personnel

Musicians
 Cannonball Adderley – alto saxophone
 Miles Davis – trumpet
 Hank Jones – piano
 Sam Jones – bass
 Art Blakey – drums

Production
 Alfred Lion – producer
 Rudy Van Gelder – recording engineer
 Leonard Feather – liner notes
 Frank Wolff – photography
 Reid Miles – cover design

References

External links
 Blue Note 1595 - List of reissues

1958 albums
Cannonball Adderley albums
Blue Note Records albums
Albums produced by Alfred Lion
Albums recorded at Van Gelder Studio